Scott Joplin: The Red Back Book is an album by the New England Ragtime Ensemble conducted by Gunther Schuller featuring the music of Scott Joplin arranged by E.J. Stark and D.S. De Lisle.  The "Red Back Book"  of the album title is taken from the popular name for the collection of band arrangements of ragtime music featuring Jopin's music, "Standard High-Class Rags" published by the Stark Music Company of St. Louis around 1912. The name came from the red color of the front and back cover.

Reception
The Allmusic review by Scott Yanow stated "Hearing Joplin's music interpreted by a group consisting of trumpet, trombone, clarinet, flute/piccolo, tuba, piano, bass, drums and a string quartet helps cast new light on these vintage themes." The Red Back Book earned a Grammy Award for Best Chamber Music Performance of 1973. It spent 54 weeks on Billboard's Top 100 Albums List.

Track listing
All music by Scott Joplin arranged by E.J. Stark and D.S. De Lisle for chamber ensemble.

 "The Cascades" – 3:27
 "Sun Flower Slow Drag" – 3:07
 "The Chrysanthemum" - 3:44
 "The Entertainer" (solo piano version) - 4:00
 "Sugar Cane" - 3:20
 "The Easy Winners" - 3:56
 "The Entertainer" - 4:15
 "Sun Flower Drag" (solo piano version) - 3:27
 "Maple Leaf Rag" - 3:11

Personnel
Charles Lewis - trumpet
Victor Sawa - clarinet
Ray Cutler - trombone
David Reskin - flute and piccolo
Gary Ofenloch - tuba
Myron Romanul - piano
Mark Belair - drums
Juan Ramirez-Hernandez - 1st violin
Tibor Pusztai - 2nd violin
Juan Dandridge - viola
Bruce Cooppock - cello
Michael Singer - bass
John Van Hamersveld - Cover Art

References 

1973 albums
Jazz albums by American artists